Al Mansoura station is the current eastern terminus station on the Doha Metro's Green Line. It serves the Al Mansoura District and Najma District. It is found on Al Mansoura Street in the Fereej Bin Dirham District, to the immediate north of Al Mansoura's northern boundary line.

Metro Link 115 is passing by Al Mansoura Station. Facilities on the premises include restrooms and a prayer room.

History
The station was opened to the public on 10 December, 2019 along with the other Green Line stations.

Station Layout

Connections
It is served by bus routes 10, 12 and 757. And Metro Link 115 is available from Al Mansoura Station.

References

2019 establishments in Qatar
Doha Metro stations
Education City
Railway stations opened in 2019